Sinobambusa tootsik, is a species of bamboo. It grows to a maximum height of 30 feet, with a maximum diameter of 1.5 inches. The culm sheaths are initially red-brown, and basally suboblong and leathery.

References

Bambusoideae
Endemic flora of China
Grasses of China